Bruce Walter Gardner Lively Stacy Elliott (May 30, 1914 – March 21, 1973) was an American writer of mystery fiction, science fiction, and television scripts.  He was also a magician who wrote several books on magic. Eliott co-founded the magicians' magazine Phoenix with Walter B. Gibson, as assistant editor, later editor.

Elliott's 15 stories in The Shadow magazine between 1946 and 1948 (issues #306-320) are held in low regard by Shadow fans because of Elliott's atypical handling of the character, best exemplified by the three stories in which the Shadow does not appear in his costumed identity.

Elliott contributed material to The Magazine of Fantasy & Science Fiction, including the acclaimed reverse-werewolf story "Wolves Don't Cry" (1954)  and a comic fantasy about Satan, "The Devil Was Sick".

In November 1972, Elliott was hit by a taxi, lapsed into a coma, and died four months later on March 21, 1973.  He was 58 years old.

Notes

External links

1914 births
1973 deaths
American mystery writers
American science fiction writers
American television writers
American male television writers
Pedestrian road incident deaths
Pulp fiction writers
American male short story writers
20th-century American novelists
American male novelists
American male screenwriters
20th-century American short story writers
20th-century American male writers
20th-century American screenwriters